Christopher Darrington (born July 13, 1964) is a former American football wide receiver who played for the Houston Oilers of the National Football League (NFL). He played college football at Weber State University.

References 

1964 births
Living people
Players of American football from Los Angeles
American football wide receivers
Weber State Wildcats football players
Houston Oilers players
National Football League replacement players